The Ministry of Transport is a Ministry of the Government of Maharashtra state.

The Ministry is headed by a cabinet level Minister. Eknath Shinde is Current Chief Minister of Maharashtra and Minister of Transport Government of Maharashtra.

Head office

List of Cabinet Ministers

List of Ministers of State

References 

Government ministries of Maharashtra
Government of Maharashtra
Maharashtra